Canoe Township is a township in Winneshiek County, Iowa, USA.

History
Canoe Township takes its name from the Canoe Creek.

References

Townships in Winneshiek County, Iowa
Townships in Iowa